Ayonika Paul (born 23 September 1992) is an Indian shooter who competes in the 10 metre air rifle event. She won the silver medal in the 2014 Commonwealth Games in Glasgow.

Ayonika Paul was confirmed by the Selection Committee of NRAI to represent India at the Rio Olympics 2016, where she finished at 47th position in the qualification round out of 51 contestants.

Early life 
She was born in September 1992 at Mumbai, India and is the daughter of Ashim Paul, a Railway employee and Aparna Paul. She studied at Swami Vivekananda high school in Chembur, Mumbai. She graduated with a Bachelor of Engineering degree from Pillai's Institute of Information Technology Engineering, Media Studies & Research affiliated to University of Mumbai,  — and has completed a Master’s in Electronics Engineering. Ayonika Paul was once an excellent swimmer but slowly her interest developed in the rifle shooting. She had earlier won Bronze in ISSF World Cup 2014 in Slovenia.

She holds a BE Electronics degree and is a member of the National Rifle Association of India.

Early Training 
She started out as a swimming champion in her early days, with her father as the coach. However her interest turned to shooting in 2006, when she saw Rajyavardhan Singh Rathod at the Athens Olympics in 2004, where he won the silver medal for India.

She got her first rifle, an imported Feinwerkvan for Rs 1.2 lakh which her father provided for through loans and thus started her journey in shooting.

Her weekly practice was done at Pune, which had better training facilities and she had to juggle through her studies and shooting practice to achieve her goals.

Career 
2007- She won her first ever medal, double gold, at the international junior competition in Suhl, Germany.

2008- A gold medal at the International Junior Shooting Competition in Munich paved her way towards an international career and brought her into the limelight.

2011- She won a bronze medal at the Asian Junior Championships in Kuwait and was ranked third.

2012- She won the bronze medal at the Asian Airgun Championships in 2015 in the 10m for Women’s 10m Air Rifle.

2014- As well as clinching the silver medal at the Commonwealth Games, held at Glasgow, Scotland she finished seventh in the women's 10-metre air rifle event at the 2014 Asian Games.

2015-She represents Maharashtra in the National Games and won the silver medal at the National Games held at Kerala.

2016- She won the silver medal at the Asia Olympic Qualifying Competition in New Delhi (IND) and thus became one of the qualifiers for shooting at the Rio Olympics, but had an early exit in the same. She was backed and supported by the NGO, Olympic Gold Quest for Rio.

2014-Bachelor in Electronics Engineering from Pillai's Institute of Information Technology Engineering, Media Studies & Research, New Panvel.

2018- Masters in Electronics Engineering specialising  in Image Processing from University of Mumbai. Having worked on Real Time Adaptive Target Tracking using computer vision, her manuscript was published in Journal of Electronic Design Engineering.

Accolades 
She is a recipient of the Maharashtra government’s Shiv Chhatrapati award.

ISSF World Medal Tally

References

External links
 
 
 
 
 

1993 births
Living people
Indian female sport shooters
Olympic shooters of India
Shooters at the 2016 Summer Olympics
Commonwealth Games medallists in shooting
Commonwealth Games silver medallists for India
Shooters at the 2014 Commonwealth Games
Asian Games competitors for India
Shooters at the 2014 Asian Games
Sport shooters from Mumbai
Sportswomen from Maharashtra
21st-century Indian women
21st-century Indian people
Medallists at the 2014 Commonwealth Games